Elections were held in the Australian state of Western Australia on 12 May 1962 to elect 10 of the 30 members of the state's Legislative Council. This was the last time the Legislative Council elections were held separately to those of the Legislative Assembly.

Results

Legislative Council

|}

Retiring Members

No MLCs retired at this election.

Candidates

Results by Province

Central

Metropolitan

Midland

North

North-East

South

South-East

South-West

Suburban

West

See also
1962 Western Australian state election

References

1962 elections in Australia
Elections in Western Australia
1960s in Western Australia
May 1962 events in Australia